Hugo Crosthwaite (born 1971 in Tijuana, Mexico) is a contemporary figurative artist best known for his black and white graphite and charcoal drawings.

Life
Crosthwaite was born in Tijuana, Mexico and grew up in the tourist-heavy beach town of Rosarito, where his parents owned a curio shop. He is the middle of three children, and worked at the shop as a boy. In 1997, Crosthwaite graduated from San Diego State University with a B.A. in Applied Arts and Sciences. Currently, the artist lives and works between Tijuana, Los Angeles, and New York.

Recent work

In 2013, Crosthwaite was chosen to represent Mexico in the California-Pacific Triennial curated by Dan Cameron at the Orange County Museum of Art. For this exhibition, inspired by the Mexican carpa, traditional tent shows that traveled along the border, he will create a site-specific mixed media installation. He was also included in the Wignall Museum of Contemporary Art’s The New World, for which he created a 42’ mural titled Guadalupana March.

In 2012, Luis De Jesus Los Angeles mounted a solo exhibition, Tijuanerias, consisting of 102 drawings and installation, which explores the “Black Legend” that mythologizes the border city. As a result of the show, the Los Angeles County Museum of Art acquired ten of Crosthwaite's drawings. In the same year, Crosthwaite's work Bartolomé, purchased by the San Diego Museum of Art, was included in Behold, America!, a collaborative exhibition which presents art of the United States from three San Diego museums, at The San Diego Museum of Art.

In 2010, collector Richard Harris, after reading a review in Art in America, commissioned Crosthwaite to create a monumental work for his collection, Morbid Curiosity: The Richard Harris Collection. The 25 x 11 foot graphite on board drawing, Death March, was exhibited at the Chicago Cultural Center in 2012. Death March depicts a funerary procession and Day of the Dead celebration, referencing engravings by Jose Guadalupe Posada of the Mexican Revolution, Skeletons Fighting for the Body of a Hanged Man by James Ensor, and The Triumph of Death by Pieter Bruegel the Elder.

Solo exhibitions
For his solo exhibition at The San Diego Museum of Art, Brutal Beauty: Drawings by Hugo Crosthwaite, Crosthwaite completed an on-site drawing entitled A Tail for Two Cities over a two-week period at the museum in 2010.

Other solo gallery exhibitions have been held at Luis De Jesus Los Angeles, Pierogi Gallery in New York, Virginia Miller Galleries in Miami, Mason Murer Fine Art in Atlanta, David Zapf in San Diego, and Noel-Baza Fine Art in San Diego, among others.

Collective exhibitions
The artist's work has been included numerous international exhibitions. A 48 x 48 inch drawing on canvas, Lion Hunt, was selected by a juror and Whitney Museum curator for inclusion in the 22nd International Juried Show at the Visual Arts Center of New Jersey in 2008.  In 2007, Crosthwaite was also featured in a traveling exhibition organized by the Museum of Contemporary Art, San Diego entitled TRANSactions: Contemporary Latin American and Latino Art.  In 2006, Crosthwaite was included in Paper Traces: Latin American Prints and Drawings from the Museum's Collection at The San Diego Museum of Art.  In 2005, two drawings, Chocada and Hombre Sobre Mesa, were included in the VII Bienal Monterrey FEMSA de Pintura, Escultura e Instalación in Monterrey, Mexico. A 6 foot square architectural drawing was included in the XII Bienal Rufino Tamayo organized by the Museo Tamayo Arte Contemporáneo in Mexico City and was shown at many venues throughout Mexico from 2004 to early 2006. A large figurative piece, Sueño Pequeño was also included in Mujeres de Juárez: Art Against Crime, an exhibition of works by artists protesting the violence against women in Juarez, Mexico.

Collections
Hugo Crosthwaite's work is held in private collections as well as museum collections including that of the Los Angeles County Museum of Art, Museum of Latin American Art, Museum of Contemporary Art, San Diego, and The San Diego Museum of Art.

References

External links
 

Living people
1971 births
21st-century Mexican male artists
People from Tijuana
People from Rosarito
San Diego State University alumni